The NCAA Cheerleading Competition previously known as NCAA Cheerdance Competition is an annual one-day event of the National Collegiate Athletic Association for cheerleading in the Philippines.

In the 87th season of the NCAA, cheerleading has been upgraded to a regular sport which means it will contribute points in the overall championship race.

Participants

Past participants

Results

Number of championships by school

See also
UAAP Cheerdance Competition
National Cheerleading Championship
International Federation of Cheerleading

References

External links
NCAA Philippines Official Site
UBelt.com
International Federation of Cheerleading official site
Philippine Sports and Entertainment Portal

National Collegiate Athletic Association (Philippines) championships
Cheerleading competitions